is a Japanese actor and voice actor affiliated with Office Osawa.

Filmography

Television animation
1990s
 Ganba! Fly High (1996) – Zenkō Kaizuka
 Cowboy Bebop (1998) – Asimov Solenson
2000s
 Initial D: Fourth Stage (2004) – Shūichi Matsumoto
 Samurai Champloo (2004) – Hanjirō
 Bleach (2005) – Tetsuzaemon Iba
 Beet the Vandel Buster (2005) – Baus
 School Rumble: 2nd Semester (2006) – Mr. Suō
 Death Note (2007) – Eiichi Takahashi
 Ghost Hound (2007) – Seiichi Suzuki
 Moribito: Guardian of the Spirit (2007) – Jiguro
 Soul Eater (2008) – Free
 One Piece (2009) – Heracles
2010s
 House of Five Leaves (2010) – Jin
 Fullmetal Alchemist: Brotherhood (2010) – Charlie
 Rainbow: Nisha Rokubō no Shichinin (2010) – Aoki
 X-Men (2011) – Jake
 The Knight in the Area (2012) – Masakatsu Kondo
 Space Brothers (2012) – Freddie Saturn
 Attack on Titan (2013) – Moblit Berner
 Ace of Diamond (2014) – Raizō Todoroki
 Akame ga Kill! (2014) – Gozuki
 Kill la Kill (2014) – Taro Genbu
 Tokyo Ghoul (2014) – Jason/Yamori
 The Seven Deadly Sins (2014) – Bartra Liones, Narrator
 Mob Psycho 100 (2016) – Fuji
 ID - Invaded (2020) – Matsuoka
 Saiyuki Reload: Zeroin (2021) - Varaharu

Original video animation (OVA)
 Legend of the Galactic Heroes (1998) – Karl von der Decken
 Demon Prince Enma (2006) – Manager
 Mobile Suit Gundam Unicorn (2010) – Saboa

Theatrical animation
 Vampire Hunter D: Bloodlust (2000) – Machira
 Nasu: Summer in Andalusia (2003) – Pizzaro
 Mind Game (2004) – Yakuza
 Bleach: Memories of Nobody (2006) – Tetsuzaemon Iba
 Bleach: Fade to Black (2008) – Tetsuzaemon Iba
 Bootleg (2009) – healthy
 Doraemon: Nobita and the Island of Miracles—Animal Adventure (2012) – Arco

Video games
 Star Wars: Republic Commando (2005) (Japanese dub) – "Boss"
Razing Storm (2010) (Japanese dub) – Uncredited
 Ryū ga Gotoku 5 (2012) – Masaru Watase
 Killer Is Dead (2013) – Damon
 Ryū ga Gotoku Ishin! (2014) – Sasaki Tadasaburō
 Soul Sacrifice (2014) – Mordred
 The Seven Deadly Sins: Grand Cross (2019) – Captain Denzel
 Ryū ga Gotoku 7: Hikari to Yami no Yukue (2020) – Masaru Watase

Television dramas
 Mito Kōmon (2011) – Shuzen Watanabe

Tokusatsu
 Gosei Sentai Dairanger (1993) – Lieutenant Colonel Shadam (eps. 1 – 10, 12 – 14, 17 – 22, 26 – 31, 37 – 38, 42 – 50)/Gorma XVI (Actor) (49–50)
 Kamen Rider Den-O (2007) – Crow Imagin (ep. 7 – 8)
 Samurai Sentai Shinkenger (2009) – Doukoku Chimatsuri (eps. 1 – 9, 11 – 16, 18 – 20, 23 – 31, 33 – 40, 45 – 49)
 Samurai Sentai Shinkenger The Movie: The Fateful War (2009) – Doukoku Chimatsuri
 Samurai Sentai Shinkenger vs. Go-onger: GinmakuBang!! (2010) – Doukoku Chimatsuri
 Samurai Sentai Shinkenger Returns (2010) – Drunk drinker (Actor)
 Tokumei Sentai Go-Busters (2012) – Burnerloid (ep. 2)

Stage
 Julius Caesar (1990)
 The Cherry Orchard (1993)

Dubbing

Live-action
 10,000 BC (2011 TV Asahi edition) – Lu'Kibu (Joel Fry)
 Bionic Woman – Antonio Pope (Isaiah Washington)
 Boss Level – Roy Pulver (Frank Grillo)
 Bullet to the Head – Robert Nkomo Morel (Adewale Akinnuoye-Agbaje)
 Edge of Tomorrow – Skinner (Jonas Armstrong)
 El Cantante – Willie Colón (John Ortiz)
 ER – Mobalage Ikabo (Djimon Hounsou)
 The Expendables 3 – Hale Caesar (Terry Crews)
 The Fast and the Furious (2005 TV Asahi edition) – Vince (Matt Schulze)
 The Fatal Encounter – Gap-soo / Sang-chaek (Jung Jae-young)
 Final Destination (2002 TV Asahi edition) – William Bludworth (Tony Todd)
 Final Destination 2 (2006 TV Tokyo edition) – William Bludworth (Tony Todd)
 The Final Girls – Duncan (Thomas Middleditch)
 Flight of Fury – Rojar (Alki David)
 The Fourth Kind – Tommy Fisher (Corey Johnson)
 Ghost (1999 TV Asahi edition) – Willie Lopez (Rick Aviles)
 Glitter – Rafael (Eric Benét)
 Gridiron Gang – Malcolm Moore (Xzibit)
 The Huntsman: Winter's War – Liefr (Sam Hazeldine)
 The Karate Kid – John Kreese (Martin Kove)
 The Karate Kid Part III – John Kreese (Martin Kove)
 The Last Stand – Lewis Dinkum (Johnny Knoxville)
 Mortdecai – Jock Strapp (Paul Bettany)
 Oblivion – Sykes (Nikolaj Coster-Waldau)
 Pacific Rim: Uprising – Sonny (Nick E. Tarabay)
 Pilgrimage – Frère Geraldus (Stanley Weber)
 Punisher: War Zone – Paul Budiansky (Colin Salmon)
 Rambo: Last Blood (2022 BS Tokyo edition) – Victor Martinez (Óscar Jaenada)
 Red Planet – Robby Gallagher (Val Kilmer)
 Safe House – Michael Collarsdale (Peter Ferdinando)
 Snitch – Daniel James (Jon Bernthal)
 Snow White and the Huntsman – King Magnus (Noah Huntley)
 The Three Musketeers – Captain Rochefort (Mads Mikkelsen)
 The Transporter – Darren "Wall Street" Bettencourt (Matt Schulze)
 Waitress – Earl Hunterson (Jeremy Sisto)
 The Way Back – Valka (Colin Farrell)
 XXX – Xander Cage (Vin Diesel)
 xXx: Return of Xander Cage – Xander Cage (Vin Diesel)
 Yakuza Princess – Shiro (Jonathan Rhys Meyers)
====Animation====
 Amphibia – Sprig Plantar
 Ben 10 – Clancy
 The Powerpuff Girls – Big Billy
 Queer Duck: The Movie – Oscar Wildcat
 Spider-Man – Blade
 Star vs. the Forces of Evil – Buff Frog
 Tron: Uprising – General Tesler

References

External links
 Rintarō Nishi at Office Osawa 
 Official blog 
 
 

1965 births
Japanese male video game actors
Japanese male voice actors
Living people
Male actors from Osaka Prefecture
20th-century Japanese male actors
21st-century Japanese male actors